Dichagyris truculenta is a moth of the family Noctuidae. It is found in the Mediterranean and central Asia from the Altai Mountains through the Near East and Middle East.

Adults are on wing from May to August. There is one generation per year.

Subspecies
Yigoga truculenta truculenta (western Siberia, central Asia, Altai, Turkestan)
Yigoga truculenta toxistigma (Anatolia, Iran)

External links
 Noctuinae of Israel

truculenta
Insects of Turkey
Moths of the Middle East
Moths described in 1853